"The Memory in My Old Wallet" is the first episode of the fourth season of the South Korean anthology series KBS Drama Special. Starring Ryu Soo-young, Nam Bo-ra and Yoo In-young, it aired on June 12, 2013.

Synopsis

Cast 
Ryu Soo-young as Lee Young-jae
Nam Bo-ra as Chae Soo-ah
Yoo In-young as Han Ji-woo
Park Jin-joo as Soo-ah's friend
Im Chae-won as Soo-ah's mother
Choi Seung-kyung as Gym teacher
Tae Hang-ho as Soo-ah's stepfather

Awards and nominations

References

External links 
 The Memory in My Old Wallet official KBS website 
 KBS Drama Special at KBS World
 A Faded Memory at Hancinema

2013 South Korean television episodes